is a party video game developed by NDcube and published by Nintendo for the Wii. The ninth main installment in the Mario Party series, it was announced at E3 2011 and released in Europe, North America, and Australia in March 2012, followed by Japan a month later. It was the first game in the series not to be developed by Hudson Soft, which was acquired and dissolved by Konami on March 1, 2012 (a day before the game's European release). Instead, development was taken over by Nintendo studio NDCube (who remains the developer of the series to this day). This was also the final Mario game to be released on the Wii.

Mario Party 9 was the second and last game in the series released for the Wii, and was followed by Mario Party: Island Tour for the Nintendo 3DS in 2013 and Mario Party 10 for the Wii U in 2015.

The game received mixed to positive reviews from critics, with praise for its gameplay, graphics, multiplayer, minigames, and content, considering it an improvement on its predecessor. However, its overhaul of mechanics received a mixed reception for its linear boards and emphasis on luck.

Gameplay

Like the previous Mario Party titles, two to four players move around a virtual board and play minigames.  A new gameplay element in all of the boards is that all four players move around together in one car. The number of spaces the player moves is determined by a roll of the dice block found within the game. Instead of trying to collect coins to buy stars, players receive Mini Stars if they pass by them. Whoever collects the most Mini Stars wins the game. While doing that, players must also try to avoid Mini Ztars, which deduct their current amount of Mini Stars. Mini Stars and Mini Ztars are replaced with bananas and Z-bananas on the board "DK's Jungle Ruins".

Minigames have a larger focus on the gameplay than they did in the previous game. However, the minigames don't appear after everyone moves, but only when a player ends up on any of the spaces or events that triggers a minigame. There are 81 minigames in total. A person can play on solo mode to unlock the final stage, as well as two playable characters.

Another new feature is that each board culminates in a boss battle that is played with all players in the vehicle. There is also a boss battle at the halfway point of a board. There are 82 minigames in Mario Party 9, divided into five categories: Free-for-all, 1-vs.-Rivals, Bowser Jr., Boss Battle, and Extra.

At the end of each stage, the number of Mini Stars the player collects is converted into Party Points, which can be used to buy new stages, constellations, vehicles, difficulties, and sounds in the museum.

Playable characters
Mario Party 9 features twelve playable characters, with two (Shy Guy and Kamek) being unlockable through Solo Mode.

Boards
There are seven boards in Mario Party 9:

 Toad Road
 Bob-omb Factory
 Boo's Horror Castle
 Blooper Beach
 Magma Mine
 Bowser Station (unlockable)
 DK's Jungle Ruins (unlockable)

Plot
The player selects a character that is not Shy Guy or Kamek to play Story Mode. One night outside of Peach's Castle, the characters come to watch the Mini Stars glitter in the sky. As the chosen character searches through the telescope, he/she notices that the stars are being sucked through a vortex, controlled by Bowser and Bowser Jr. on a spacecraft, who are using a vacuum-like machine to suck the stars in the sky. Upon witnessing this, the character leads a charge with the others and sets out to defeat them and save the Mini Stars. Shy Guy and Kamek then follow them from behind, as part of Bowser's plan. The chosen character then travels through all six courses to recover the Mini Stars, fighting off two henchmen selected by Bowser. They must defeat Shy Guy and/or Kamek on each course, but will have at least one ally for the first five courses unless otherwise stated. If Shy Guy or Kamek win, the player must restart the course.

The final course is Bowser Station, where the character must defeat both Shy Guy and Kamek en route to defeating Bowser. Bowser's machines trapping the Mini Stars are destroyed, and all the Mini Stars will return to the sky. The player's character will wave goodbye to the stars as they depart for the night sky. Bowser and Bowser Jr. are seen flying in their Clown Cars, their plan to decorate their castle with Mini Stars foiled. All the characters then reunite to witness the Mini Stars once again, and the story concludes with the ending sentences:
"And so the adventure came to an end. 
Rescued by (the character that the player chose), the Mini Stars were free to glitter in the night sky forever."

Reception

Mario Party 9 received mixed or average reviews according to the review aggregation website Metacritic.  In Japan, Famitsu gave it a score of one nine, two eights, and one nine, for a total of 34 out of 40.

German magazine N-Zone gave Mario Party 9 a 75% score for single player mode, and 85% for multiplayer mode. Nintendo Power said that "the majority of the game's 82 activities are fun", while commenting that "some may be discouraged by the game's radical changes". IGN praised the game's graphical improvement and its control style. Like previous Mario Party games, IGN strongly criticized the luck-based factor of the game. GamesRadar praised Mario Party 9 for being balanced, but criticized the predictability of the boards. Ashton Raze of GameSpot said that the game is too "predictable" and "much too familiar". However, he praised the game's wide variety of fun mini-games and cheerful, colorful visuals.

, Mario Party 9 sold 2.24 million copies worldwide.

References

External links
 Japanese official site
Mario Party 9 North America Official Website

2012 video games
CAProduction games
Mario Party
Multiplayer and single-player video games
NDcube games
Party video games
Video games developed in Japan
Wii games
Wii-only games